Scheuring may refer to:

People:
 Hanna Scheuring (1965), a Swiss actress and theatre director

Places:
 Scheuring, a municipality in Germany